David Jonathan Panka (born 3 October 1999) is a Dutch professional footballer who plays as a winger for Greek Super League 2 club Panathinaikos B.

Career
Following the disbandment of the RKC Waalwijk youth team, Panka joined Polish I liga side Miedź Legnica in July 2020. After his contract was terminated at the end of 2020, Panka later moved to USL Championship side Sporting Kansas City II on 19 February 2021. However, his contract was mutually terminated on 6 May 2021.

Personal
Panka holds both Dutch and Polish citizenship.

References

External links
 

1999 births
Living people
Dutch footballers
Dutch expatriate footballers
Dutch expatriate sportspeople in Poland
Dutch expatriate sportspeople in the United States
Expatriate soccer players in the United States
Association football midfielders
Miedź Legnica players
Sporting Kansas City II players
I liga players